Walter Bachman may refer to:

 Walter C. Bachman (1911–1991), American ship designer and marine engineer
 Walter E. Bachman (1879–1958), American college football player and coach